The State Seal of the Republic of the Union of Myanmar is the national emblem used in all official government documents, including publications. As the seal is an official symbol, there are State Seal Law and Principles regarding appropriate usage of it.

Description

At the centre of the Seal is the map of the Republic of the Union of Myanmar. The sprigs of Eugenia containing fourteen leaves each are on either side of the map.
The sprigs of Eugenia are flanked on each side by an artistic Myanmar lion. The lion on the left side faces towards the left and the lion on the right side faces towards the right 
The name of the country in Burmese, is expressed on the ribbon at the foot of the Seal. The expression  is on the scroll which is under the left lion. The expression  is under the map. The expression  is  under the right lion. 
The large yellow five-pointed star indicating above uprightly is at the top of the Seal.
The other part of the seal is surrounded by Myanmar traditional floral arabesques.

Usage
The State seal can be used for the following:
Can be used in the Presidential Palace.
Can be used in/on the vehicles of the president.
Can be used in the Central Parliament Buildings (Pyidaungsu Hluttaw, Pyithu Hluttaw and Amyotha Hluttaw), the union level government offices, State and Region Hluttaw Buildings, Offices of State and Region Government, Self-Administered Zones and Divisions.
Can be used in ministries and their child agencies' offices, in the courts and the organizations and departments which are allowed to use by the Union Government.
Can be used in Myanmar Embassies, consulates and one other representations.
Can be printed on the objects which are used in State Receptions.
Can be used in bank notes and stamps.
Can be used by the organizations which are allowed use by the president.
Can be used in the official documents of Central Parliaments and State & Region, the Union Government and the ministries, the State, Region and SAZ and SAD Governments, the organizations and department which are allowed by the union government.
Can be used in State meetings and ceremonies.

History

Before 1948

Konbaung dynasty 

The previous state symbol of Burmese monarchs was the green peacock. Late kings of Konbaung dynasty adopted the circular State Seal bearing a peacock on the sun surrounded by the text: မြန်မာနိုင်ငံတံဆိပ်တော်.

British Burma 
 
After being annexed by the British Empire, the Royal Coat of Arms of the United Kingdom replaced the place of State seal. After Burma was separated from India, the green peacock on a yellow was adopted as the national symbol and badge of Burma, in 1939. But the State Seal was still the Coat of Arms of United Kingdom.

Japanese puppet state

The State of Burma, a Japanese puppet state, adopted the circular seal bearing stylized golden peacock as the State seal in 1943.

Current design 
The current design of the State Seal was first introduced at the Constituent Assembly of the Union of Burma in 1947.

4 January 1948 — 3 January 1974 

The State Seal of Burma, approved by the Constituent Assembly in 1947, contained the Burmese text  on the banner, which means "Republic of Union of Myanmar" (the same as the text in the current State Seal except the spelling of the word that mean President or Republic), as well as three lions. Additionally, there was a circle surrounding the map of the country containing Verse 194 of the Buddhavagga in the Dhammapada in Pali:  (samaggānaṃ tapo sukho), which translates to "Happy is the practice of those in harmony." It was adopted at the independence of the country on 4 January 1948.

3 January 1974 — 19 October 1988 

The 1974 Constitution of the Socialist Republic of the Union of Burma adopted a new State Seal with Socialist symbols : a pinion (cogwheel) with 14 teeth, surrounding the map of Myanmar, surrounded by two paddy ears, the two artistic Burmese lions besides the branches: The left lion facing to the left and the right lion facing to the right, The words , which means "Socialist Republic of the Union of Myanmar", on the ribbon banner at the bottom. It was adopted together with the new State flag and the 1974 constitution on 3 January 1974. The original publications of 1974 constitution shows the State flag with full colours, but it shows the State seal only in white and black. But in the official usage, it is always yellow and black. The e-book version of the 1974 constitution from Myanmar Law Information System shows the blue State seal from Wikipedia in place of the State seal.

19 October 1988 — 31 January 2011 

On 19 October 1988, the State Law and Order Restoration Council enacted a law which replaces the expression "Socialist Republic of the Union of Myanmar" with the expression "Union of Myanmar". The State Seal was modified as the country name in State Seal Law had been replaced: the words  ("Socialist Republic") were removed.

Changes to current State Seal 

In 2008, the Constitution of the Republic of the Union of Myanmar for Burma was approved by a referendum. In this new constitution, changes have been made to the State Seal. The new State Seal uses the colours red and gold/yellow. The new Laws and Principles for State Seal were passed on 21 October 2010 (but were not enforced immediately) and the new State Seal was displayed on the television on that day's afternoon. But the new state seal had not been adopted yet until 2011.
It was adopted on the day the 2008 Constitution came into force, on 31 January 2011.

Symbolism (historical and current)

Peafowl 

Peafowl symbolizes the race of the sun.

Lion (Leograph) 

The reason of the inclusion of 3 lions in the State Seal was given as follow:
 In the traditional view of ancient sages, the nature of lion gives the natures of bravery, diligence, extinguishing any size of danger with the same effort, purity and virtue. Such characteristics can make Myanmar honoured and they are the ones that Myanmar citizens should imitate.
 Being surrounded by three lions means defending and protecting Myanmar. In the view of astrologist monks and persons, number three means "divisible by three" (end of all evil events).
 Lion and Myanmar are regarded as compatible paring according to astrology.
 Lion and traditional floral arabesques are inserted and decorated, so it is assumed as giving respect to an ancient traditional Myanmar culture appropriate for the modern Union of Myanmar.

State Motto on the Circle 

 (samaggānaṃ tapo sukho), which can be translated to "Happy is the practice of those in harmony," is from Verse 194 of the Buddhavagga in the Dhammapada.

Ears of Paddy 

Ears of paddy are the symbol for cultivating class.

Pinion 

Pinion (cogwheel) is the symbol for working class.

Five-Pointed Star (Mullet) 

Five-pointed star represents the revolution/resistance and the struggle for independence of Myanmar against colonialist and fascists.

Sprigs of Eugenia 

Eugenia sprig symbolizes victory.

Map of Myanmar 

The map of Myanmar in the State Seal symbolizes the principal that the Sovereign power of the State is derived from the citizens and is in force in the entire country.

Myanmar traditional floral arabesques  

Myanmar traditional floral arabesques are included to decorate the State seal as representation of ancient Myanmar traditions which are appropriate for modern Union of Myanmar.

State Name 

The then conventional long names of the State are included in the State Seals,
 The 1948 State Seal included the name "ပြည်ထောင်စု သမတ-မြန်မာ နိုင်ငံတော်။", which is the de facto long name sometimes appeared in some official documents, longer than the then official conventional long name "ပြည်ထောင်စုမြန်မာနိုင်ငံတော်".
For each words, "ပြည်ထောင်စု" means "union"; "သမတ" (old spelling of "သမ္မတ") means "president"; "မြန်မာ" means "Burma/Myanmar"; and "နိုင်ငံတော်" means "State".
When "သမတ/သမ္မတ" (president) and "နိုင်ငံတော်" (State) are put together, this combination means "republic".

 The 1974 State Seal included the then conventional long name "ပြည်ထောင်စု ဆိုရှယ်လစ်သမ္မတ မြန်မာနိုင်ငံတော်". 
For each words, "ပြည်ထောင်စု" means "union"; "ဆိုရှယ်လစ်" means "socialist"; "သမ္မတ" means "president"; "မြန်မာ" means "Burma/Myanmar"; and "နိုင်ငံတော်" means "State".
When "သမ္မတ" (president) and "နိုင်ငံတော်" (State) are put together, this combination means "republic".

 The 1988 State Seal included the then conventional long name "ပြည်ထောင်စု မြန်မာ နိုင်ငံတော်".
For each words, "ပြည်ထောင်စု" means "union"; "မြန်မာ" means "Burma/Myanmar"; and "နိုင်ငံတော်" means "State".

 Current State Seal includes the current conventional long name "ပြည်ထောင်စု သမ္မတ မြန်မာနိုင်ငံတော်".
For each words, "ပြည်ထောင်စု" means "union"; "သမ္မတ" means "president"; "မြန်မာ" means "Burma/Myanmar"; and "နိုင်ငံတော်" means "State".
When "သမ္မတ" (president) and "နိုင်ငံတော်" (State) are put together, this combination means "republic".

Gallery

See also

 State Flag of Myanmar

References
http://www.hubert-herald.nl/Myanmar1.htm

Myanmar
National symbols of Myanmar
Burma
Burma
Burma